Blepharoneuron is a genus of North American plants in the grass family.

 Species
 Blepharoneuron shepherdii (Vasey) P.M.Peterson & Annable - northern Mexico (Chihuahua, Durango, Sonora, Zacatecas) 
 Blepharoneuron tricholepis (Torr.) Nash - United States (CO AZ CA UT NM TX), northern + central Mexico

See also 
 List of Poaceae genera

References 

Poaceae genera
Bunchgrasses of North America
Grasses of Mexico
Grasses of the United States
Native grasses of California
Native grasses of Texas
Flora of Northeastern Mexico
Flora of Northwestern Mexico
Flora of the South-Central United States
Flora of the Southwestern United States
Taxa named by John Torrey
Chloridoideae